Last Man Standing is the third studio album by American rapper MC Eiht, and his first solo album outside the Compton's Most Wanted brand. It was released on November 11, 1997 through Epic Street. Recording sessions took place at X Factor Studios, Echo Sound, Half Oz. Studios, Skip Saylor Recording, and Track Record in California. Production was handled by MC Eiht, DJ Slip, DJ Muggs, Massive and Daz Dillinger. It features guest appearances from Boom Bam, Big Nasty, B-Real, Da Foe, Daz Dillinger, Hie Tiimes, Lil' Hawk and Mon-Diggi. The album peaked at number 64 on the Billboard 200 and at number 13 on the Top R&B/Hip-Hop Albums chart in the United States.

Track listing

Sample credits
Track 3 contains a sample from "Be With Me" written by Leo Graham, Ruben Locke Jr. and Darryl Cortez Ellis, as recorded by Tyrone Davis
Track 4 contains a sample from "Hey Girl" written by Carole King and Gerry Goffin, as recorded by Cornell Dupree
Track 9 contains a sample from "Morning" written by Clare Fischer, as recorded by Donald Byrd
Track 14 contains a sample from "Hangin' on a String (Contemplating)" written by Carl McIntosh, Steve Nichol and J. Peters, as recorded by Loose Ends

Personnel

Aaron Tyler – main artist, keyboards (track 6), programming (track 14), producer (tracks: 5-7, 11, 13, 14, 16-18), co-producer (track 3), executive producer, mixing (tracks: 1-3, 5-8, 11, 13, 14, 16-18)
Gene Heisser – featured artist (tracks: 1, 8)
Hie Tiimes – featured artist (track 3)
Da Foe – featured artist (track 6)
Lil' Hawk – featured artist (track 6)
Big Nasty – featured artist (track 6)
Mon-Diggi – featured artist (track 8)
Delmar Drew Arnaud – featured artist & producer (track 10)
Louis Freese – featured artist (track 12)
Terry Keith Allen – keyboards (tracks: 1, 17), guitar programming (track 6), programming (track 14), producer (tracks: 1, 3, 7, 8, 14, 17), co-producer (tracks: 5, 6, 11, 13, 18), engineering (tracks: 1-3, 5-8, 11, 13, 14, 16-18)
M. "Massive" Ford – keyboards & producer (track 2)
William Fredric Zimmerman – keyboards (tracks: 5-7, 11, 13, 16-18)
Priest "Soopafly" Brooks – keyboards (track 10)
Horace "Bokie" Coleman – guitar (tracks: 3, 8, 11, 13, 17, 18), bass (track 3)
Lawrence Muggerud – producer & mixing (tracks: 4, 9, 12, 15)
Don L. Bartholomew – mixing (tracks: 1-3, 5-8, 11, 13, 14, 16-18)
Dave Aron – mixing (track 10)
Tony Robert Alvarez – engineering (tracks: 1-3, 5-8, 11, 13, 14, 16-18)
Joe Warlick – engineering (tracks: 4, 9, 12, 15)
Peter Dokus – art direction, photography
Giulio Costanzo – design
Ted Lowe – A&R
John W. Smith – management
Kenneth M. Smith – management

Charts

References

External links 

1997 albums
MC Eiht albums
Epic Records albums
Albums produced by MC Eiht
Albums produced by DJ Muggs
Albums produced by Daz Dillinger